State Road 49 (SR 49) is a , north–south state highway in the northwestern part of the U.S. state of Indiana. Its northern terminus is at an intersection with U.S. Route 12 (Dunes Highway) in Porter near the entrance to Indiana Dunes State Park.

Route description 
The southern terminus of SR 49 is in Barkey Township at State Road 14 (SR 14), the site of the former town of Lewiston.  SR 49 heads north, passing through Wheatfield and Kouts. At the southern border of Valparaiso, SR 49 becomes a four-lane divided highway and has interchanges with U.S. Route 30 and SR 2. Between Valparaiso and Chesterton, SR 49 has interchanges with U.S. Route 6 and Interstate 80/Interstate 90/Indiana Toll Road. In Chesterton, SR 49 has an interchange with Interstate 94 before passing into Porter, where it has an interchange with U.S. Route 20. North of the interchange with US 20, the road is again a two-lane road to its northern terminus at the intersection with U.S. Route 12.

History 

Before 1926, SR 49 was a named Liberty Way from Kouts to Valparaiso, it was a named state route.  After 1926, SR 49 was a two-lane highway from Valparaiso to Chesterton, known as "Old State Road 49".  When the Valparaiso Bypass was completed the old route was decommissioned and turned over to the City of Valparaiso, the City of Chesterton, and Porter County.

Major intersections

See also
Indiana State Road 149
Indiana State Road 249

References

External links

Northwest Indiana
049
Transportation in Jasper County, Indiana
Transportation in Porter County, Indiana